This is a list of 123 species in Cleonis, a genus of cylindrical weevils in the family Curculionidae.

Cleonis species

 Cleonis albicans Sturm, 1826 c
 Cleonis albida Dejean, 1821 c
 Cleonis albolineata Sturm, 1826 c
 Cleonis albovestita O'Brien & Wibmer, 1982 c
 Cleonis alternans Dejean, 1821 c
 Cleonis arabs Dejean, 1821 c
 Cleonis arctica Dejean, 1821 c
 Cleonis atomaria Dejean, 1821 c
 Cleonis attenuata Dejean, 1821 c
 Cleonis barbara Dejean, 1821 c
 Cleonis bicarinata Fischer, 1830 c
 Cleonis bipunctata Zoubkoff, 1829 c
 Cleonis boucardi O'Brien & Wibmer, 1982 c
 Cleonis brevirostris Dejean, c
 Cleonis bryanti O'Brien & Wibmer, 1982 c
 Cleonis calandroides O'Brien & Wibmer, 1982 c
 Cleonis californica O'Brien & Wibmer, 1982 c
 Cleonis capensis Dejean, c
 Cleonis carinata Zoubkoff, 1829 c
 Cleonis chilensis Blanchard, E. in Gay, 1851 c
 Cleonis cinerea Dejean, 1821 c
 Cleonis clathrata Dejean, 1821 c
 Cleonis complanata Zubkov, 1833 c
 Cleonis corioginosa Zubkov, 1833 c
 Cleonis cristata O'Brien & Wibmer, 1982 c
 Cleonis daurica Steven, c
 Cleonis declivis Sturm, 1826 c
 Cleonis densa O'Brien & Wibmer, 1982 c
 Cleonis dentata O'Brien & Wibmer, 1982 c
 Cleonis denticollis O'Brien & Wibmer, 1982 c
 Cleonis distincta Dejean, 1821 c
 Cleonis ericeti Dejean, 1821 c
 Cleonis excavata Zubkov, 1833 c
 Cleonis excoriata Dejean, 1821 c
 Cleonis farcta O'Brien & Wibmer, 1982 c
 Cleonis fasciata Fischer, 1830 c
 Cleonis faunus Dejean, 1821 c
 Cleonis fossulata Fischer von Waldheim, 1823 c
 Cleonis fossa O'Brien & Wibmer, 1982 c
 Cleonis foveolata Fischer von Waldheim, 1823 c
 Cleonis frontata Fischer von Waldheim, 1823 c
 Cleonis furcata Zubkov, 1833 c
 Cleonis glauca Dejean, 1821 c
 Cleonis globulosa Villa & Villa in Catteneo, 1844 c
 Cleonis grammica Dejean, 1821 c
 Cleonis granosa Zubkov, 1833 c
 Cleonis granulata Fischer, 1823 c
 Cleonis granulosa Mannerheim, 1824 c
 Cleonis hieroglyphica Dejean, c
 Cleonis hololeuca Fischer von Waldheim, 1823 c
 Cleonis humeralis Zoubkoff, 1829 c
 Cleonis hystrix O'Brien & Wibmer, 1982 c
 Cleonis illustris Dejean, 1821 c
 Cleonis imperialis Karelin, 1837 c
 Cleonis infracticornis Sturm, 1826 c
 Cleonis inscripta Dejean, 1821 c
 Cleonis interrupta Zoubkoff, 1829 c
 Cleonis jacobina O'Brien & Wibmer, 1982 c
 Cleonis lateralis Sturm, 1826 c
 Cleonis leucon Sturm, 1826 c
 Cleonis leucophylla Fischer, 1823 c
 Cleonis leucoptera Fischer von Waldheim, 1823 c
 Cleonis livida Dejean, 1821 c
 Cleonis lugens Sturm, 1843 c
 Cleonis lupinus O'Brien & Wibmer, 1982 c
 Cleonis madida Dejean, 1821 c
 Cleonis marginata Fischer von Waldheim, 1823 c
 Cleonis marmorata Dejean, 1821 c
 Cleonis mexicana O'Brien & Wibmer, 1982 c
 Cleonis mixta O'Brien & Wibmer, 1982 c
 Cleonis modesta (Mannerheim, 1843) i c
 Cleonis morbillosa Dejean, 1821 c
 Cleonis myagri Dejean, 1821 c
 Cleonis nebulosa Dejean, 1821 c
 Cleonis obliqua Dejean, 1821 c
 Cleonis obsoleta Sturm, 1826 c
 Cleonis ocularis Dejean, 1821 c
 Cleonis oculata Fischer, 1830 c
 Cleonis ophthalmica Dejean, 1821 c
 Cleonis pacifica Dejean, 1821 c
 Cleonis palmata Dejean, 1821 c
 Cleonis perlata Dejean, 1821 c
 Cleonis pigra (Scopoli, J.A., 1763) c g  (large thistle weevil)
 Cleonis pilosa O'Brien & Wibmer, 1982 c
 Cleonis pleuralis O'Brien & Wibmer, 1982 c
 Cleonis plicata Dejean, 1821 c
 Cleonis plumbea O'Brien & Wibmer, 1982 c
 Cleonis porcata O'Brien & Wibmer, 1982 c
 Cleonis poricollis O'Brien & Wibmer, 1982 c
 Cleonis porosa O'Brien & Wibmer, 1982 c
 Cleonis praepotens O'Brien & Wibmer, 1982 c
 Cleonis pulverulenta Zoubkoff, 1829 c
 Cleonis punctiventris Sturm, 1826 c
 Cleonis quadricarinata Dejean, 1821 c
 Cleonis quadrilineata O'Brien & Wibmer, 1982 c
 Cleonis quadrimaculata Sturm, 1826 c
 Cleonis quadrisulcata Sturm, 1826 c
 Cleonis quadrivittata Zoubkoff, 1829 c
 Cleonis quinquelineata Sturm, 1826 c
 Cleonis raphilinea Sturm, 1826 c
 Cleonis ritablancaensis (Sleeper, 1969) i
 Cleonis rorida Dejean, 1821 c
 Cleonis rudis Klug, c
 Cleonis saginata O'Brien & Wibmer, 1982 c
 Cleonis sardoa Chevrolat, 1869 g
 Cleonis scabrosa Sturm, 1826 c
 Cleonis sexmaculata Zubkov, 1832 c
 Cleonis sisymbrii Dahl, c
 Cleonis sparsa Zubkov, 1833 c
 Cleonis stigma Sturm, 1826 c
 Cleonis striatopunctata Sturm, 1826 c
 Cleonis sulcirostris Dejean, 1821 c
 Cleonis texana O'Brien & Wibmer, 1982 c
 Cleonis tigrina Dejean, 1821 c
 Cleonis tigris Schneider, 1829 c
 Cleonis tricarinata Fischer, 1823 c
 Cleonis vittata Zoubkoff, 1829 c
 Cleonis wickhami O'Brien & Wibmer, 1982 c

Data sources: i = ITIS, c = Catalogue of Life, g = GBIF

References

Cleonis
Articles created by Qbugbot